Hinchcliffe is an English surname deriving from the place called Hinchcliff, near Holmfirth, in West Yorkshire. Notable people with the surname include:

Alys Hinchcliffe (b. 1995), Welsh footballer
Andy Hinchcliffe, former England and Everton footballer
Celina Hinchcliffe, English sports broadcaster
James Hinchcliffe, Canadian race car driver
John Hinchcliffe, British rugby league footballer of the 1960s
Philip Hinchcliffe, retired English television producer, writer and script editor
Tony Hinchcliffe, American comedian and writer
W.G.R. Hinchcliffe (1894–1928), Royal Naval Air Service and Royal Air Force flying ace

See also
Hinchliffe

References